Miyota, Nagano held a mayoral election on February 18, 2007. Moteki Yuji won the election, beating incumbent mayor Tsuchiya Kiyoshi.

Candidates 

 Moteki Yuji, independent candidate supported by the Japanese Communist Party
 Tsuchiya Kiyoshi, incumbent independent mayor.

Results

References 
 Results from JanJan 
 Japan Press coverage

2007 elections in Japan
Mayoral elections in Japan
February 2007 events in Japan
Miyota, Nagano